Hibbertia bracteata is a species of flowering plant, in the family Dilleniaceae, and is endemic to eastern New South Wales. It is a shrub with lance-shaped to oblong leaves and yellow flowers with about sixteen stamens arranged on one side of the two carpels.

Description
The flowers are arranged in leaf axils or on the ends of branchlets and are sessile. Each flower sits on a ring of brown bracts. There are about sixteen stamens arranged on one side of the two silky-hairy carpels. Flowering occurs from late winter to summer.

Taxonomy
This species was first described in 1817 by Augustin Pyramus de Candolle and given the name Pleurandra bracteata in Regni Vegetabilis Systema Naturale, from an unpublished description by Robert Brown (botanist, born 1773). In 1863, George Bentham changed the name to Hibbertia bracteata in Flora Australiensis.

Distribution and habitat
Hibbertia bracteata is widespread in heath and forest in the Sydney district and in the Blue Mountains.

References

bracteata
Flora of New South Wales
Plants described in 1817
Taxa named by Augustin Pyramus de Candolle